The Third Front Movement was a massive industrial development by China in its interior starting in 1964. It involved large-scale investment in national defense, technology, basic industries (including manufacturing, mining, metal, and electricity), transportation and other infrastructure investments.

"Third Front" is a geo-military concept: it is relative to the "First Front" area that is close to the potential war fronts. The Third Front region covers 13 provinces and autonomous regions with its core area in the Northwest (including Shaanxi, Gansu, Ningxia, and Qinghai) and Southwest (including nowadays Sichuan, Chongqing, Yunnan, and Guizhou). It was motivated by national defense considerations, most noticeably the escalation of the Vietnam War after the Gulf of Tonkin Incident, the Sino-Soviet Split and small-scale border skirmishes between the two countries.

While based on national defense considerations, the Third Front Movement in fact industrialized part of China’s most interior and agricultural region. The area of the Third Front is the hardest part of China for any invading foreign power to access. During the Second Sino-Japanese War of 1937-45, it remained unconquered.  The Kuomintang (at that time in alliance with the Chinese Communists based at Yan'an) made Chongqing their capital.  Some Chinese industry was also moved there from the cities.  So while the 'Third Front' strategy had precedents, the scale of the Third Front Movement was far larger than the one initiated by the Kuomintang. The relative size of the Third Front Movement (as a share of the total national investments) was also larger than the China Western Development Movement initiated in 2001. Between 1964 and 1980, China invested 205 billion yuan in the Third Front Region, accounting for 39.01% of total national investment in basic industries and infrastructure. Millions of factory workers, cadres, intellectuals, military personnel, and tens of millions of construction workers, flocked to the Third Front region. More than 1,100 large and medium-sized projects were established during the Third Front period. With large projects such as Chengdu-Kunming Railway, Panzhihua Iron and Steel, Second Auto Works, the Third Front Movement stimulated previously poor and agricultural economies in China’s southwest and northwest. Dozens of cities, such as Mianyang, Deyang, Panzhihua in Sichuan, Guiyang in Guizhou, Shiyan in Hubei, emerged as major industrial cities. However, the designs of many Third Front projects were deficient. For national defense reasons, location choices for the Third Front projects followed the guiding principle “Close to mountains, dispersed, hidden” (kaoshan, fensan, yinbi). Many Third Front projects were located in remote areas that were hard to access. Many of them were far away from supplies and potential markets. The Third Front Movement was carried out in a hurry. Many Third Front projects were simultaneously being designed, constructed, and put in production, (biansheji, bianshigong, bianshengchan). The degree of inefficiency was egregious. Since the mid-1970s, government subsidies gradually dwindled. Since the reform of state-owned enterprises starting in the 1980s, many Third Front plants went bankrupt. Yet some others reinvented themselves and continued to serve as pillars in their respective local economies.

Definition 
The “Third Front” refers to a geographic area in China’s interior. It is relative to the “First Front” area on the East Coast, Northeast, and Xinjiang, places likely to be the immediate war fronts in case of war. Beijing-Guangzhou Railway, Wushaoling, Yanmen Pass, and Nanling form the boundary of the Third Front. Specifically, its geographic region included three provinces in the Southwest (Sichuan, including today’s Chongqing, Yunnan, and Guizhou), three provinces and one ethnical autonomous region in the Northwest (Shaanxi, Qinghai, eastern part of Gansu, Ningxia), parts of Hebei, Henan, and Hunan that are to the west of the Beijing-Guangzhou Railway, and Northwest Guangxi and South Shanxi.  The rest of China between the First Front and the Third Front was called the Second Front; the vast area between provinces on the First Front and the Beijing-Guangzhou Railway. The Second Front includes Anhui, Jiangxi and east parts of Hebei, Henan, Hubei, Hunan. Among the Third Front region, Guizhou, the mountainous East Sichuan, Sichuan Basin, South Shaanxin (Hanzhong and the northern piedmont of the Qin Mountains) attracted the most firms, research institutes, and workers due to the Third Front Movement. Panzhihua in Sichuan and Jiuquan in Gansu hosted new steel industries. Sichuan and Longxi County, Gansu has clusters of mining firms for nonferrous metals. Coal mining firms were scattered across Sichuan, Yunnan, Guizhou, Gansu, Qinghai, Shaanxi. Hydropower stations were built on the upper reaches of the Yangtze River and the Yellow River, while new large-scale thermal power stations were built in cities such as Baoji in Shaanxi, Guiyang in Guizhou. Machinery plants were mainly located in Sichuan and Guizhou. Chengdu in Sichuan received many plants producing electronic devices and airplanes. Mianyang and Guangyuan received many plants in the nuclear industry and the electronic industries. Chongqing is a center for conventional weapons, producing rifles, tanks, trucks, and conventional powered submarines. Guiyang formed a cluster of photo-electricity plants. Anshun has a new cluster of airplane plants. Some of these firms in the Third Front were relocated from the First Front and the Second Front regions, yet many more were newly built.

The aforementioned Third Front region was under direct leadership of the State Council of the People’s Republic of China, thus is also called the “Big Third Front”. In contrary, “Small Third Front” regions include the mountainous and rear parts of each province in the First and Second Front. Provincial level governments led the industrialization of these regions. Plants that produce conventional weapons, basic industries were moved to or newly built in these regions. The purpose of the construction of the Small Third Front is to make individual provinces capable of self-defense in the event of war. Many Small Third Front regions were previously Communist-controlled regions during the Republican era and the Chinese Civil War with the Nationalist China.

Process

Background 
China’s economy suffered from the Great Leap Forward in 1958 and the Great Famine from 1959 to 1961. Afterwards, Mao Zedong claimed that he would not be involved in economic planning. Recovery of agricultural production became the key of economic planning. The Central Committee once set the economic recovery and economic structure adjustment as the goal for the Third Five-Year Plan. In February 1962, Chen Yun proposed that the Third Five-Year Plan should “solve the problems of food, clothes, and other life necessities” (jiejue chichuanyong). Zhou Enlai, in his report of the State Council on March 28, also reported that “[the government] should put agriculture in the primary place of the nation’s economy. The economic planning should follow the priorities such that agriculture comes first, light industries comes next, heavy industries have the lowest priority”. In early 1963, a central planning team (led by Li Fuchun, Li Xiannian, Tan Zhenlin, Bo Yibo) put “solving the problems of food, clothes, and other life necessities” (解决人民的吃穿用) as the priority of economic works in their proposal for the Third Five-Year Plan.

The plan got objections from Mao Zedong. He said: ”The Third Five-Year Plan […] need to set basic industries in the Southwest.” He said that agricultural and defense industries are like fists, basic industries are like the hip.  “The fists cannot be powerful unless the hip is well seated.” According to Mao’s judgment, there was possibility that China would be involved in a war, while China’s population and industries were concentrated on the east coast. According to a military report evaluating the distribution of industries in 1964, China’s 14 cities with population above 1 million had 60% of civil machinery industries, 50% of chemical industries, and 52% of national defense industries. These cities had high population density and were mostly on the coast, therefore were susceptible to air strikes. Major transportation hubs, bridges, ports and some dams were close to these major cities. Destruction of these infrastructures could lead to disastrous consequences. Mao thus claimed that developing heavy industries and defense industries should be set as the priorities, while agriculture comes next. Developing the Third Front region was particularly important strategically. The purpose of the Third Front Movement, according to an official document later, was to “establish a complete industrial system in China’s interior parts”.

The Gulf of Tonkin Incident on August 2, 1964 quickly changed the discussion about the Third Five-Year Plan. The Vietnam War quickly escalated after the Gulf of Tonkin Incident, followed by massive bombing of North Vietnam. Part of Yunnan and Hainan were also affected. After that, discussion of the Third Front Movement became the dominant topic for economic planning. In 1965, special commissions for Third Front Movement were established. On September 14, 1965, the Central Planning Commission submitted the final proposal for the Third Five-year Plan, where the Third Front Movement had the central position in the plan.

However, whether there would be war and whether the Third Front Movement was necessary had been under discussion even after the Third Five-Year Plan was passed. There was a famous episode of conversation when Mao was visiting Tianjin. Mao asked whether the Third Front Movement will be unnecessary and wasteful. The local cadre answered: ”No. Even the enemies will not come, the Third Front Movement will still be useful to economic development.” Mao was happy with the answer. In fact, investment in the Third Front region was largely affected by the security situation. The two climaxes of the Third Front region, was between 1965 and 1967 after the Gulf of Tonkin Incidence, and between 1970 and 1971 after the Conflict over the Zhenbao Island in 1969 with the Soviet Union. Between 1964 and 1980, more than 1,100 large and medium-sized projects were established in the Third Front region. Thousands of plants and hundreds of thousands of workers moved from big coastal cities to the mountains in the west. In early stages of the Cultural Revolution, the Third Front region was also the destination of many rusticated youths.

Construction of the Third Front 
The hallmark of the Third Front Movement was a strategic shift to China’s interior. In a report to Mao Zedong on August 19, 1965, Li Fuchun, Bo Yibo and Luo Ruiqing suggested that no new projects should be constructed in major cities in the First Front. Existing plants in the First and Second fronts, should be “split into two” and move one copy to the Third Front region. According to the Third Five-Year Plan passed in September, 1965, investment in the Third Front region accounted for 42.2% of the national total. In sections such as heavy industries, national defense industries, and transportation industries, the share of the Third Front region was about 74%.

Third Front projects followed the principle “Close to the mountains, dispersed, and hidden”. This principle was motivated by national defense considerations, plants were required to be hidden in the mountains and were not allowed to be geographically clustered to minimize the damage of air strikes. This principle was first used to guide the location choices of some highly confidential firms, but was quickly used as the guiding principle for location choices of essentially all Third Front projects. As the Cultural Revolution ignited leftist extremism, Lin Biao, Chen Boda also replaced Li Fuchun, Peng Dehuai, and Deng Xiaoping as the actual leaders of the Third Front Movement. Peng and Deng were later purged by their political enemies. Lin Biao revised the principle to “Close to the mountains, dispersed, and hidden in the caves”, which required Third Front Projects to be located in the caves. Many plants were not able to produce qualified products due to difficult locations. An electronic plant in Guiyang was built in the caves. The humidity and dim light induced the products to be deficient. Plants were required to be dispersed geographically such that there would be alternative units producing in case some plants were destroyed. However, this principle was used to an extreme. About 90% of the 400 new Third Front projects in Shaanxi were located in places far away from cities. The airplane factory in Hanzhong, Shaanxi had 28 units of the plant were spread in 2 districts, 7 counties. One unit was spread in 7 villages. It was scoffed by some as “building airplanes by the side of henhouse”. Assembling parts required dozens of miles of transportation. While transportation infrastructure and communication was poor, production was often interrupted. Some plants were located in places prone to geographic hazards such as landslides and earthquakes. Location choices of the Third Front projects also did not consider accessibility to inputs and outputs.  A shipyard on the Yangtze River near Chongqing was responsible to produce conventional powered submarines in the 70s. The up stream of the Yangtze River is too shallow for submarines. To test the submarines, they needed to be tugged to Shanghai some 2000 kilometers down the stream where the Yangtze meets the Pacific. No doubt the production is very inefficient.

There were countless defects in the Third Front projects. Part of the reason is that the Third Front movement was carried out in a hurry, many plants started producing while they were still being designed and constructed. A second reason was that following the Sino-Soviet Split, thousands of Soviet experts left China. China had to use its own technologies, which were less developed by that time, in most of the Third Front projects. A third reason for the defects in the Third Front projects was because the difficult geographic locations. The Gezhouba Dam, China’s largest hydropower station by then, had to pause its construction for two years due to “errors in design”. Since the 1980s, deficiencies in design and construction in the Chengdu-Kunming Railway engulfed another 10 million yuan. The Jiuquan Steel factory, constructed in the early 1970s, still produced no steel but only small amounts of pig iron by 1980. These problems were widespread. Partly due to these problems, many Third Front plants went bankruptcy when the state-owned firms were made responsible for their own viability.

Besides newly built large projects, many Third Front plants were spinoffs or entirely moved from existing plants in other parts of the country. In a document issued in early 1965, plants in the First and Second Fronts were required to contribute their best equipment and workers to the Third Front Movement. This priority is reflected in the slogans at the time such as “Choose the best people and best horses for the Third Front”, “For the people, get ready for war and get ready for famine”. Incomplete statistics show that between 1964 and 1970, 380 large projects, 145 thousand workers and 38 thousand units of equipment, were moved from the coastal areas to the Third Front region. Most of these firms came from cities like Shanghai, Beijing, Shenyang, Dalian, Tianjin, Nanjing. Many universities and research institutes also moved to the Third Front.

Transition to the market economy 
Lin Biao died in an air crash when on route fleeing to the Soviet on September 13, 1971. The leftists policies that dominated the Third Front movement were also corrected. After Nixon’s China trip in 1972, investment to the Third Front region gradually declined. China’s economic reform in the urban sector started in the early 1980s, national economic policies once again focused on the east coast. Many state-owned enterprises went bankrupt during this period. Due to bad designs and location choices, Third Front plants were especially unprofitable. In the Seventh Five-Year Plan between 1986 and 1990, Third Front plants not making a profit were allowed to shut down. Some Third Front plants moved out of the mountains and caves to nearby small and medium sized cities where the geography and transportation were less difficult. Plants with workshops spread across many places gathered in one place. Third Front plants, especially military plants, were encouraged to produce for the civilian market (junzhuanmin). Many Third Front plants went bankrupt, yet there were also successful stories. Jialing Motors, China’s largest producers of motor cycles, was previously a machinery factory that produces vehicles for the military, including tanks. Changhong Electronics, a manufacturer of television sets, was reinvented from a plant producing electronic devices (including radars) for the military. The submarine manufacturer mentioned in the previous subsection switched to produce river cargo boats. These plants continued to be economic pillars and stimulators for the local economies. "Part of the achievement is that a batch of 'backbone' enterprises has evolved from the `Third Front' to develop more than 2,000 products including satellite and automobile parts and civilian aircraft," said Ji Dawei, a chief co-ordinator for the relocation drive.

Evaluation and current role 
China’s Southwest and Northwest started to host important centers of military industries. Sichuan’s Xichang and Gansu’s Jiuquan became centers of China’s successful satellite and rocket industries. Sichuan’s Mianyang became an important research city with many innovative firms.

A large part of the Third Front Movement was confidential. The mountainous terrain and geographical isolation of the region have added to this concealment. Due to the emphasis that China has placed on concealment of its special weapons capabilities, it is doubtful whether any other country, perhaps even including the United States, has identified all of China's special weapons related facilities. (Chinese Nuclear Weapons) Many of them may still be hiding in the mountains.

The Third Front Movement was an economic fiasco at the national level. Billions of yuan and millions of workers were devoted to the Third Front projects, yet due to bad design and extremism, achievements were limited. It is widely regarded as an “economic campaign in the wrong place at the wrong time”. Barry Naughton, a professor and China expert, pointed out that investment in the Third Front Movement was “too soon, too much”. Most Third Front plants were in heavy and military industries, which had limited role in improving the welfare of local people. Many Third Front plants became economic unsuccessful once the government ceased huge amounts of subsidies. Local economies where they were located were depressed as a result.  Many plants in the mountains, dams on China’s great rivers, also raised environmental concerns in the recent years.

On the other hand, the Third Front Movement effectively narrowed the regional disparities. In 1963, 7 western provinces: Yunnan, Guizhou, Sichuan, Shaanxi, Ningxia, and Qinghai, accounted for 10.5% of China’s industrial output. This ratio went up to 13.26% by 1978. By 1980, the programs had created a railway grid linking previously isolated parts of western China, in addition to a galaxy of power, aviation and electronic plants, said Zhang Yunchuan, minister of the Commission for Science, Technology and Industry for National Defense. (People's Daily Online).  Initial industries brought in by the Third Front plants and infrastructure kick-started the industrialization of China’s remote and mountainous west. Existing cities in the Third Front such as Xi’an, Lanzhou, Chengdu, Chongqing, and Guiyang benefited from large investments during this period. Cities such as Shiyan in Hubei, Mianyang and Panzhihua in Sichuan, were literally created by the Third Front Movement.

China's Western Development, initiated in 2001, was shaped by the Third Front. In more than 20 years after the economic reforms, as East China was booming, the machinery, metallurgical, chemical and non-ferrous mineral and other companies based in the 'Third Front' have laid a solid foundation for the economic takeoff of western China. As migration was heavily restricted, Third Front plants served as local magnets for people getting away from farming. Without the Third Front Movement, the regional disparity between West China and East China would likely have been larger.

Media
 The Third Front is the setting for a recent Chinese film called Shanghai Dreams directed by Wang Xiaoshuai.  Set in the 1980s, it is a bleak and thoughtful drama that shows the life of some ordinary families who had moved there and would like to move back to Shanghai. 
 11 Flowers, also directed by Wang Xiaoshuai, reflects the director's own experience growing up in a Third Front City.
 24 City, directed by Jia Zhangke, follows three generations of characters related to a Third Front plant in Chengdu. The plant was moved from the Northeast and produces engines for airplanes. In the 2000s, its factory complex in downtown Chengdu was re-developed into a real estate project.

References

External links 
 China's military industry enterprises come out of mountains to world market

Books and articles 
 
 
 
 

Economic development in China
Military history of the People's Republic of China
Economic history of the People's Republic of China